Morten Christiansen (born 4 January 1978) is a Danish professional football midfielder, who currently plays for FC Royal.

External links
Lyngby BK profile
Danish Superliga statistics

1978 births
Living people
Danish men's footballers
AC Horsens players
Lyngby Boldklub players
Danish Superliga players
Footballers from Aarhus

Association football midfielders
VSK Aarhus players